This article lists the members of the People's Representative Council from 1956 to 1959. The 5th People's Representative Council follows the 1955 Indonesian legislative election held on 29 September 1955. There are 257 elected MPs and 15 appointed MPs in the Parliament.

Composition 

Fractions in the council consisted of two types: single-party fractions (marked in green) and multi-party fractions (marked in yellow).

Leadership

Elected

Appointed 

Lists of members of the People's Representative Council